Metendothenia fidelis is a moth of the family Tortricidae first described by Alexey Diakonoff in 1973. It is found in Sri Lanka, East Timor and Bali.

References

Moths of Asia
Moths described in 1973